HNoMS Tyr was a mine control vessel used for underwater search and recovery by the Royal Norwegian Navy. It was decommissioned in 2014 and sold to private owners.

History
Tyr was built at Voldnes Skipsverft in 1981 and was used as an offshore standby-ship in the North Sea under the name MS Standby Master, yard number 31. The Royal Norwegian Navy took her over in December 1993, and Tyr went through a comprehensive rebuilding and modernization program between 1994 and February 1995 at the Mjellem & Karlsen shipyard in Bergen. Under the rebuilding Tyr was equipped with new thrusters, the bridge was expanded and a mine hangar was built on the aft-deck, and new hydraulic equipment was installed on the work-deck. Tyr was fitted with tactical systems, and was equipped with a Scorpio ROV. The furnishings were also modernized.

Sold to Idefix Danmark ApS, Hobro. Renamed IDEFIX, August 2014.

Wreck discoveries and recoveries

HNoMS Tyr has discovered and/or recovered several wrecks:

Localization and filming of the German battleship Scharnhorst in cooperation with the Norwegian Broadcasting Corporation.
Localization and filming of the Polish troop-transport ship Chrobry, sunk in the Vestfjorden in 1940.
Localization and filming of the Norwegian coastal express ship , sunk off Bodø on 23 October 1940.
Localization and filming of the Royal Navy destroyer Hunter sunk on 10 April 1940 during the Battles of Narvik
Localization of the German prisoner transport ship Palatia, sunk in the Second World War. This is the second largest ship disaster in Norwegian history.
Relocalization of  the Norwegian submarine Uredd, sunk on 24 February 1943 after hitting a German minefield.
Localization and recovery of a Norwegian F-16 fighter jet, which had crashed in Bindalsfjorden, May 1997.
Localization and recovery of a Norwegian F-16 fighter jet, which had crashed in the sea off Landegode, Bodø.
Search  localization of assumed deceased, after the Sleipner disaster.
Search and recovery of both helicopter and the deceased after a helicopter crashed in the Førdefjorden in October 1996.

References

External links 

Video from HNoMS Tyr 
Another video from HNoMS Tyr 

1981 ships
Ships built in Norway
Mine warfare vessels of the Royal Norwegian Navy